On 20 October 1935, a census was made in 57 provinces, 356 districts, 34.876 villages. Turkey's population was defined as 16,188,767. It was determined that 7,936,770 of the population was male (48.1%) and 8,221,248 (50.9%) were female.

Populations of the provinces

Religion statistics

References 

Censuses in Turkey
1935 censuses